David Paul Longden (born 28 September 1962) is an English former footballer who played in the Football League for Barnsley and Scunthorpe United. After his release by Barnsley, Longden turned down a move to Australia to join Scunthorpe on a free transfer.

He became a regular for The Iron over the next decade and was voted by supporters as the club's player of the year following the 1989-1990 season. Nicknamed 'Longy' or 'Waxy' by teammates, Longden was awarded a testimonial prior to the start of the 1992-93 season.

Despite  being forced to retire after breaking his leg aged just 30, he is second on Scunthorpe's all-time appearance list with 461 games, behind only Jack Brownsword in first place.  His only two professional goals both came in penalty shoot-outs.

After retirement, Longden managed the Scunthorpe United club restaurant and 'Iron Bar' alongside coaching in the club's academy, before relocating to North Yorkshire in 2005 to run a post office.

References

External links
 

English footballers
English Football League players
1962 births
Living people
Barnsley F.C. players
Scunthorpe United F.C. players
Association football defenders